Aeretes is a genus of squirrels that contains a single extant species, the groove-toothed flying squirrel (Aeretes melanopterus).

Two fossil species are also known from Late Pliocene of China.

The earliest fossil record of Aeretes was found in South China in Middle Pleistocene deposits. In the Beijing area, the earliest records are from Upper Cave and Tianyuan Cave at Zhoukoudian. These fossils are of the Late Pleistocene age. The geographical distribution of this species are very limited. Aeretes experience evolution through the increase and decrease of tooth size throughout time.

References

Rodent genera
Flying squirrels
Mammal genera with one living species